Antonio Machaca is an indigenous leader from Bolivia who served as the elected Apu Mallku, or spiritual leader, of CONAMAQ - Consejo Nacional de Ayllus y Markas del Qollasuyu (national council of indigenous communities of the Collasuyu) for 2004.  He was succeeded by Evo Morales.

References

Apu Mallku
Bolivian politicians
Inca Empire
Living people
Year of birth missing (living people)